Norman Boyd (born 16 October 1961) is a Unionist politician in Northern Ireland who served as a Member of the Northern Ireland Assembly (MLA) for South Antrim from 1998 to 2003.

Boyd was born in Belfast and attended Belfast High School and Newtownabbey Technical College before working in banking. At the 1998 Northern Ireland Assembly election, Boyd was elected for the UK Unionist Party (UKUP) to represent South Antrim.

In January 1999, he joined three of the four other UKUP Assembly members in forming the Northern Ireland Unionist Party. He acted as whip for the new group, and was selected to stand for Westminster under his new party label at the 2000 South Antrim by-election, but withdrew during the campaign, calling on his supporters to back the Democratic Unionist Party candidate William McCrea.  He did stand for the South Antrim seat at the 2001 general election, but came bottom of the poll, with only 972 votes.  He also failed to be elected to Newtownabbey Borough Council.

At the 2003 Assembly election, Boyd was able to take only 774 votes, and lost his seat, along with all his party colleagues.

Boyd later joined the Traditional Unionist Voice (TUV), and stood for the party in the 2019 Northern Ireland local elections, where he contested the Three Mile Water ward on Antrim and Newtownabbey Borough Council.

At the 2022 Assembly election, Boyd was the TUV's candidate in East Antrim.

He was eliminated on the 5th count, with David Hilditch of the Democratic Unionist Party (DUP) taking the constituency's final seat.

References

The Northern Ireland Assembly: Norman Boyd

1961 births
Living people
Northern Ireland MLAs 1998–2003
UK Unionist Party MLAs
Politicians from Belfast
Northern Ireland Unionist Party MLAs
20th-century British politicians
21st-century British politicians
Traditional Unionist Voice politicians